Elmore Smith (born May 9, 1949) is an American former professional basketball player born in Macon, Georgia. A  center from Kentucky State University, he played  in the National Basketball Association (NBA) from 1971 to 1979.  He was a member of the Buffalo Braves, Los Angeles Lakers, Milwaukee Bucks, and Cleveland Cavaliers.

Early life
Smith was born in Macon, Georgia, and was a graduate of Ballard-Hudson High School in Macon.

As a 5-11 high school freshman, he didn't make the team. But after sprouting to 7 feet over the next two years, Smith said, "The principal threatened me: 'If you don't go out for basketball, we're going to kick you off campus.' "

Making the team but rarely playing, Smith had only three scholarship offers "just by being tall and coordinated," he said. He originally enrolled at Wiley College, but he was told his playing time would be limited. So, he transferred to Kentucky State.

College career
Smith attended Kentucky State University. He is listed among the top rebounders in college basketball. He was a member of the 1970 and 1971 NAIA Championship teams, coached by Lucias Mitchell, playing alongside teammate Travis Grant. He holds the NAIA record for most rebounds in a season (799 rebounds in 1971), and tops the NCAA All-Division list.

In 1968–1969, Smith averaged 14.8 points and 19.8 rebounds. In 1969–1970 he averaged 21.6 points and 22.7 rebounds and in 1970–1971, he averaged 25.5 points and 24.2 rebounds, leading Kentucky State to NAIA Championships his last two seasons.

After compiling career averages of 21.3 points and 22.6 rebounds, Smith left for the NBA his senior year in 1971.

NBA career
Smith was drafted by the Buffalo Braves in the 1st round (3rd pick) of the 1971 NBA Draft on March 29, 1971.

In his first season, Smith averaged 17.3 points per game and 15.2 rebounds per game, playing alongside Bob Kauffman, and was named to the NBA All-Rookie Team. His rebounding average for that season is the eighth-highest ever recorded by an NBA rookie.

In 1972–1973, he averaged 18.3 points and 12.4 rebounds for the Braves. Then, on September 12, 1973 he was traded by the Braves to the Los Angeles Lakers for Jim McMillian.

With the Lakers in 1973–74, Smith averaged 12.5 points with 11.2 rebounds and a league leading 4.9 blocked shots.  The 1973–1974 season was the first in which blocked shots were officially recorded by the NBA, and Smith set a still-standing record of 17 blocks in a game against Portland on October 28, 1973.

In 1974-75 Smith averaged 10.9 points and 10.9 rebounds with 2.9 blocks for the Lakers. On June 16, 1975 Smith was part of a historic trade. He was traded by the Los Angeles Lakers with Junior Bridgeman, Dave Meyers and Brian Winters to the Milwaukee Bucks for Kareem Abdul-Jabbar and Walt Wesley.

After 34 games with Milwaukee in 1975–76, Smith was traded on January 13, 1977 with Gary Brokaw to the Cleveland Cavaliers for Rowland Garrett, a 1977 1st round draft pick (Ernie Grunfeld was later selected) and a 1978 1st round draft pick (George Johnson was later selected).

In 1976–77, Smith averaged 12.5 points, 8.4 rebounds and 2.2 blocks for the 43–39 Cavaliers under Coach Bill Fitch.

Smith was plagued by a knee injury, that required surgery, and played in only 24 games for Cleveland in 1977–78, the last of his career.

Smith is best remembered for his shot-blocking, earning him the nickname "Elmore the Rejector". He led the league in total blocked shots twice (in 1974 and 1975), and holds the NBA record for most blocked shots in a game since 1973, with 17   He achieved this mark against the Portland Trail Blazers on October 28, 1973, while playing for the Lakers. Smith's average of 4.85 blocks per game from the 1973–74 season (the first season blocked shots were officially recorded in the NBA) is the third highest ever. He was also a skilled rebounder, and he averaged a double-double (13.4 points, 10.6 rebounds) over the course of his career.

NBA career statistics

Regular season

|-
| align="left" | 1971–72
| align="left" | Buffalo
| 78 || - || 40.8 || .454 || - || .534 || 15.2 || 1.4 || - || - || 17.3
|-
| align="left" | 1972–73
| align="left" | Buffalo
| 76 || - || 37.2 || .482 || - || .558 || 12.4 || 2.5 || - || - || 18.3
|-
| align="left" | 1973–74
| align="left" | Los Angeles
| 81 || - || 36.1 || .457 || - || .590 || 11.2 || 1.9 || 0.9 || style="background:#cfecec;" | 4.9* || 12.5
|-
| align="left" | 1974–75
| align="left" | Los Angeles
| 74 || - || 31.6 || .493 || - || .485 || 10.9 || 2.0 || 1.1 || 2.9 || 10.9
|-
| align="left" | 1975–76
| align="left" | Milwaukee
| 78 || - || 36.0 || .518 || - || .632 || 11.4 || 1.2 || 1.0 || 3.1 || 15.6
|-
| align="left" | 1976–77
| align="left" | Milwaukee
| 34 || - || 23.2 || .447 || - || .581 || 6.1 || 0.9 || 0.6 || 2.0 || 8.4
|-
| align="left" | 1976–77
| align="left" | Cleveland
| 36 || - || 18.8 || .504 || - || .519 || 6.4 || 0.4 || 0.4 || 2.1 || 8.7
|-
| align="left" | 1977–78
| align="left" | Cleveland
| 81 || - || 24.6 || .497 || - || .663 || 8.4 || 0.7 || 0.6 || 2.2 || 12.5
|-
| align="left" | 1978–79
| align="left" | Cleveland
| 24 || - || 13.8 || .531 || - || .692 || 4.4 || 0.5 || 0.3 || 0.7 || 6.5
|- class="sortbottom"
| style="text-align:center;" colspan="2"| Career
| 562 || - || 31.8 || .482 || - || .579 || 10.6 || 1.4 || 0.8 || 2.9 || 13.4
|}

Playoffs

|-
| align="left" | 1973–74
| align="left" | Los Angeles
| 5 || - || 34.2 || .477 || - || .706 || 10.6 || 1.2 || 1.4 || 1.6 || 19.2
|-
| align="left" | 1975–76
| align="left" | Milwaukee
| 3 || - || 34.7 || .556 || - || .667 || 7.3 || 0.3 || 0.7 || 3.7 || 14.7
|-
| align="left" | 1976–77
| align="left" | Cleveland
| 3 || - || 18.7 || .545 || - || .625 || 8.0 || 0.3 || 1.7 || 1.0 || 13.7
|-
| align="left" | 1977–78
| align="left" | Cleveland
| 2 || - || 28.0 || .458 || - || .500 || 9.5 || 0.0 || 1.5 || 1.5 || 12.5
|- class="sortbottom"
| style="text-align:center;" colspan="2"| Career
| 13 || - || 29.8 || .500 || - || .654 || 9.1 || 0.6 || 1.3 || 1.9 || 15.8
|}

Personal life
Smith is the father of three daughters.

Smith started a barbecue sauce business in 2006 after years of making sauces for family and friends. His sauces are served at Elmore Smith's Smokehouse Restaurant located in Cleveland's Rocket Mortgage FieldHouse or online.

Smith has remained in the Cleveland area and is frequently seen at Cavalier games.

Honors
 Smith was inducted into the Kentucky State Athletics Hall of Fame in 2002.
 In 2008, Smith was inducted into the Georgia Hall of Fame.
 Smith was inducted into the Greater Cleveland Sports Hall of Fame in 2014.
 In 2017, he was inducted into the Small College Basketball Hall of Fame.

See also
List of National Basketball Association players with most blocks in a game

References

External links

1949 births
Living people
African-American basketball players
Basketball players from Georgia (U.S. state)
Buffalo Braves draft picks
Buffalo Braves players
Centers (basketball)
Cleveland Cavaliers players
Kentucky State Thorobreds basketball players
Los Angeles Lakers players
Milwaukee Bucks players
Sportspeople from Macon, Georgia
American men's basketball players
21st-century African-American people
20th-century African-American sportspeople